The state of Connecticut funds and operates the Connecticut Technical High School System (CTHSS), also known as the Connecticut Technical Education and Career System (CTECS). It is a statewide system of 17 diploma-granting technical high schools, and one technical education center, serving approximately 10,200 full-time high school students with comprehensive education, and training in 38 occupational areas. CTECS also serves approximately 5,500 part-time adult students in apprenticeship and other programs. Two full-time adult programs are offered in aviation maintenance.

High school students receive a technical college preparatory curriculum, and earn a Connecticut high school diploma as well as a certificate in a specific trade technology. Approximately 45 percent of graduates go on to college, and approximately 50 percent go on to employment, apprenticeships, or the military following graduation.

Adult students are provided full-time, post-high school programs in aviation mechanics (P&M), apprentice training, and part-time programs for retraining and upgrading skills. Many customized educational programs and services for youth and adults also are provided. These include English for language learners (ELL) programs, tech prep relationships, handicapped and psychological services, and a full complement of remedial programs. Program relevance is ensured through an extensive network of technology advisory committees, authentic assessment, and an aggressive response to the implementation of emerging technologies of the workplace.

List of Schools in the Connecticut Technical High School System
The Connecticut Technical High School System is made up of 17 degree-granting technical high schools, with several satellite campuses and one technical education center:

 Henry Abbott Technical High School
 Bristol Technical Education Center
 Bullard Havens Technical High School
 Howell Cheney Technical High School
 Connecticut Aero Tech Center
 H. H. Ellis Technical High School
 E. C. Goodwin Technical High School
 Ella T. Grasso Southeastern Technical High School
 W.F. Kaynor Technical High School
 Norwich Technical High School
 Emmett O'Brien Technical High School
 Platt Technical High School
 A.I. Prince Technical High School
 Stratford School for Aviation Maintenance Technicians
 Vinal Technical High School
 Eli Whitney Technical High School
 H.C. Wilcox Technical High School
 Windham Technical High School
 Oliver Wolcott Technical High School
 J. M. Wright Technical High School

See also
Vocational school
Association for Career and Technical Education

References

External links

Connecticut State Department of Education
Public education in Connecticut
School districts in Connecticut